John Wayne "Jack" Norris (born August 5, 1942) is a Canadian former professional ice hockey goaltender. Norris played parts of four seasons in the National Hockey League, along with another four seasons in the World Hockey Association, between 1964 and 1976.

Career 
Norris joined the NHL with the Boston Bruins in the 1964–65 season, playing 23 games as the backup to Eddie Johnston, but lost his spot the following season to Gerry Cheevers. Norris was subsequently traded to the Chicago Black Hawks, where he played ten games over two seasons. Norris spent significant time in the minor leagues before eventually joining the Los Angeles Kings as the backup to Denis DeJordy.

After spending the 1971–72 season in the minor leagues, Norris joined the Alberta Oilers for the WHA's inaugural 1972–73 season. He spent two seasons as the starter with the Oilers (renamed Edmonton Oilers in 1973–74 season) and two more with the Phoenix Roadrunners before retiring in 1976.

Career statistics

Regular season and playoffs

References

1942 births
Living people
Boston Bruins players
Canadian expatriate ice hockey players in the United States
Canadian ice hockey goaltenders
Chicago Blackhawks players
Dallas Black Hawks players
Edmonton Oilers (WHA) players
Estevan Bruins players
Ice hockey people from Saskatchewan
Los Angeles Blades (WHL) players
Los Angeles Kings players
Minneapolis Bruins players
Montreal Voyageurs players
Oklahoma City Blazers (1965–1977) players
Phoenix Roadrunners (WHA) players
Seattle Totems (WHL) players
Springfield Kings players